Philautus cardamonus is a species of frogs in the family Rhacophoridae.

It is endemic to Cambodia, only known from the vicinity of the type locality in the Phnom Sankos Wildlife Sanctuary in the Cardamom Mountains.

Its natural habitat is subtropical or tropical moist montane forests.

References

cardamonus
Endemic fauna of Cambodia
Amphibians of Cambodia
Frogs of Asia
Amphibians described in 2002
Taxonomy articles created by Polbot